Milka Arsova (born 5 May 1989) is a Macedonian footballer who plays as a defender. She has been a member of the Macedonia women's national team.

References

1989 births
Living people
Women's association football defenders
Macedonian women's footballers
North Macedonia women's international footballers